The Manisa Subregion (Turkish: Manisa Alt Bölgesi) (TR33) is a statistical subregion in Turkey.

Provinces 

 Manisa Province (TR331)
 Afyonkarahisar Province (TR332)
 Kütahya Province (TR333)
 Uşak Province (TR334)

See also 

 NUTS of Turkey

External links 
 TURKSTAT

Sources 
 ESPON Database

Statistical subregions of Turkey